KYNT (1450 AM, "Radio 1450") is a radio station licensed to serve Yankton, South Dakota.  The station is owned and licensed by Riverfront Broadcasting LLC  It airs a mix of Classic Hits, Variety Hits, and  Soft Adult Contemporary formats.

The station was assigned the KYNT call letters by the Federal Communications Commission.

Ownership
In February 2008, Riverfront Broadcasting LLC reached an agreement with NRG Media to purchase this station as part of a six station deal.

References

External links
FCC History Cards for KYNT
KYNT official website

YNT
Classic hits radio stations in the United States
Adult hits radio stations in the United States
Soft adult contemporary radio stations in the United States
Riverfront Broadcasting LLC
Radio stations established in 1955
1955 establishments in South Dakota